Hypsiglena jani, commonly known as the Texas night snake or the Chihuahuan night snake, is a small species of mildly venomous snake in the family  Colubridae.  The species is native to the southwestern United States and adjacent northeastern Mexico.

Etymology
The epithet, jani, is in honor of Italian taxonomist Giorgio Jan.

Description
It is typically a light gray or tan in color, with dark brown or dark gray blotching down the back, and has an unmarked underside. It has smooth dorsal scales. The eye has a vertically elliptical pupil. H. jani is rear-fanged, and is considered to be venomous, though it is not dangerous to humans.

Behavior
As the common names imply, H. jani is a primarily nocturnal snake.

Diet
The diet of H. jani consists of primarily lizards, but it will also eat smaller snakes and occasionally soft bodied insects.

Habitat
H. jani prefers semi-arid habitats with rocky soils.

Reproduction
H. jani is an oviparous species that breeds in the spring rainy season, laying 4-6 eggs that take approximately 8 weeks to incubate before hatching.

Geographic range
H. jani ranges from southern Kansas to southern Colorado, and south throughout New Mexico, the western half of Texas to central Mexico.

Subspecies
Three subspecies are recognized as being valid, including the nominotypical subspecies.
Hypsiglena jani dunklei 
Hypsiglena jani jani 
Hypsiglena jani texana 

Nota bene: A trinomial authority in parentheses indicates that the subspecies was originally described in a genus other than Hypsiglena.

References

Further reading
Dugès A (1865). "Du Liophis janii". Mém. Acad. Sci. Lett. Montpellier 6: 32–33. (Liophis jani, new species). (in French).
Powell R, Conant R, Collins JT (2016). Peterson Field Guide to Reptiles and Amphibians of Eastern and Central North America, Fourth Edition. Boston and New York: Houghton Mifflin Harcourt. xiv + 494 pp., 47 plates, 207 figures. . (Hypsiglena jani, pp. 409–410 + Plate 39).
Stejneger L (1893). "Annotated List of the Reptiles and Batrachians Collected by the Death Valley Expedition in 1891, with Descriptions of New Species". North American Fauna 7: 159–228. (Hypsiglena texana, new species, p. 205).
Tanner WW (1944). "A Taxonomic Study of the Genus Hypsiglena ". Great Basin Naturalist 5 (3 & 4): 25–92. (Hypsiglena dunklei, p. 48; H. ochrorhynchus janii, pp. 48–51; and H. o. texana, pp. 51–54).

External links

Herps of Texas: Hypsiglena jani

Hypsiglena
Reptiles of the United States
Fauna of the Western United States
Fauna of the Plains-Midwest (United States)
Fauna of the Southwestern United States
Taxa named by Alfredo Dugès
Reptiles described in 1866